Eyvazalılar (also, Eyvazallar, Eyvazalylar, and Eyvazlılar) is a village and municipality in the Beylagan Rayon of Azerbaijan.  It has a population of 2,248.

References 

Populated places in Beylagan District